Island Pond is a  water body located in Cheshire County in southwestern New Hampshire, United States, in the town of Stoddard. It is fed primarily by the outflow from Highland Lake, and its outlet is a tributary of the North Branch Contoocook River, part of the Merrimack River watershed.

The lake is classified as a warmwater fishery and contains largemouth and smallmouth bass, rock bass, yellow perch, pumpkinseed and horned pout.

See also

List of lakes in New Hampshire

References

External links
Island Pond Association

Lakes of Cheshire County, New Hampshire
Lakes of New Hampshire
Stoddard, New Hampshire